Claudia Llosa Bueno (born 15 November 1976) is a Peruvian film director, writer, producer, and author. She is recognized for her Academy-Award-nominated film The Milk of Sorrow.

Early life 
Claudia Llosa was born on November 15, 1976 in Lima, Peru. Her mother Patricia Bueno Risso is an artist from Italy and her father Alejandro Llosa Garcia worked in the engineering field. Her siblings are Patricia Llosa and Andrea Llosa. She is the niece of the Peruvian writer Mario Vargas Llosa and the film director Luis Llosa.

She studied at Newton Collegein Lima. Her post-secondary studies were spent majoring in Film Direction at the University of Lima.

Llosa moved from Peru to Madrid in the late 1990s. From 1998 to 2001 she studied there at the film academy Escuela TAI. At the end of her studies she started working on the script for Madeinusa. She moved to Barcelona to work in the advertising industry.

Career 
Claudia Llosa’s first film Madeinusa tells the story of a rural and religious village in Peru. In Madeinusa, the events occur over the Easter season due to the belief that during this period of time a person can sin without being punished. Madeinusa premiered in competition at Sundance Festival 2006 where it was nominated for the Grand Jury Prize, won the prize for the best unpublished script at the 2003 Havana Film Festival and several international awards, including the FIPRESCI international critics award at Rotterdam Festival and the Best Latin American Film Award at Malaga Festival, among others.

In 2009 Llosa finished her second film The Milk of Sorrow (La teta asustada). The Milk of Sorrow was inspired by the era of terrorism which the citizens of Peru experienced between 1980 and 1992. This era gave rise to the Andean folk belief, which this movie is based on, that women who experienced trauma during this period of time would pass on their anxieties to their children through their breast milk. The film was shot over a period of six weeks with filming locations in Lima or near the capital. The film was written and directed by Claudia Llosa and the creation of The Milk of Sorrow included the help of cinematographer Natasha Braier and camera operator Guillermo Garcia Meza. The film was shortlisted for the 59th Berlin International Film Festival. It was the first Peruvian film nominated for the Golden Bear award, and won the main award. Llosa's film also gained recognition from awards such as FIPRESCI in 2009 and multiple awards at the Lima Film Festival. In Lima, Peru The Milk of Sorrow outsold the ticket sales of the film Slumdog Millionaire during its premiere. However, in the more rural communities of Peru The Milk of Sorrow did not gain the same reception.

On February 2, 2010 Llosa's The Milk of Sorrow was nominated for the Academy Award in the Best Foreign Film Category. Also in 2010 Claudia Llosa was invited to become a member of Hollywood’s Academy of Motion Picture Arts and Sciences.

According to film scholar Sarah Barrows, Claudia Llosa’s films do not portray stereotypes of the indigenous communities of Peru. Although Llosa does not portray these stereotypes her films do not always receive a positive reaction from these communities due to the more serious depiction of them in films and the subject matters surrounding them. Llosa's films tend to focus on the harshness and difficulties these communities may face and for that reason indigenous communities do not see it as complimentary.

In 2012 Claudia Llosa's short film Loxoro, produced by the Oscar winner Juan José Campanella was shortlisted for the Berlin International Film Festival. Loxoro won the Teddy Award in the category of Best Short Film.

Claudia Llosa is the author of children's book La Guerrera de Cristal. This was her first work of literature and was published in 2013.

Her 2014 film Aloft had its premiere in the competition section of the 64th Berlin International Film Festival.

Filmography 

To date no other movie has been scheduled to be directed by Llosa.

Awards and nominations

References

External links 
 Interview zu Madeinusa bei cinemawithoutborders.com (englisch)
 Interview zu Madeinusa bei kinothusis.ch (PDF-Datei, deutsch; 25,2 KB)
 
 The Magic Realism of Peruvian Claudia Llosa's 'La Teta Asustada' and 'Madeinusa.'

1976 births
Peruvian screenwriters
Living people
Peruvian film directors
Peruvian women film directors
Peruvian film producers
Peruvian people of Italian descent
University of Lima alumni
People from Lima
Directors of Golden Bear winners